Carmen Ionescu may refer to:

 Carmen Ionescu (gymnast) (born 1985), retired Romanian artistic gymnast
 Carmen Ionesco (birth name Ionescu; born 1951), Canadian discus thrower and shot putter of Romanian descent